The Men's 66 kg competition at the 2019 World Judo Championships was held on 26 August 2019.

Results

Finals

Repechage

Pool A

Pool B

Pool C

Pool D

Prize money
The sums listed bring the total prizes awarded to 57,000$ for the individual event.

References

External links
 
 Draw

M66
World Judo Championships Men's Half Lightweight